FSCC is an abbreviation that can refer to:

Faulkner State Community College, a two-year college located in Alabama
Federation of Civil Service Unions, a trade union affiliate in Mauritius
Fort Scott Community College, a two-year college located in Kansas
Franciscan Sisters of Christian Charity, a congregation of Roman Catholic apostolic religious women
Fairthrope Sports Car Club
Fort Saskatchewan Correctional Centre, a provincial correctional centre near Edmonton, Alberta